Oh Stacey (Look What You've Done!) was the third single from The Zutons second album Tired of Hanging Around, to be released, on 18 September 2006. It entered as the band's eighth consecutive UK Top 40 single, peaking at No. 24 in the UK Singles Chart.

Video
The music video shows a blonde woman (presumably called Stacey) murdering the band members one by one, and their ghosts singing the song in the morgue. Stacey (whose face is hidden by shadow) cuts off McCabe's head with an axe, flattens Pritchard with a car, ties up and suffocates Harding with a rag soaked in something and sends Payne and Chowdhury over the edge of a building. It is revealed that the blonde woman is Harding's evil twin and the death scenes are shown again with Stacey's face revealed, she is played by Harding in a blonde wig.

Track listing

CD Version 1
 "Oh Stacey (Look What You've Done!)"
 "Please Calm Me Down"

CD Version 2
 "Oh Stacey (Look What You've Done!)"
 "You Know You Can Be Friends"
 "Tired of Hanging Around" (Alternate Version)
 "Oh Stacey (Look What You've Done!)" (Video)

7" Version
 "Oh Stacey (Look What You've Done!)"
 "Some Say It's Wise"

External links
 Video

The Zutons songs
2006 singles
2006 songs
Songs written by Dave McCabe